The 339th Flight Test Squadron is a United States Air Force unit based at Robins Air Force Base, Georgia.    It is part of the Warner Robins Air Logistics Center, with a mission to certify aircraft as worthy to return to service. The squadron is responsible for conducting flight tests on the Lockheed C-130 Hercules, the Lockheed C-5 Galaxy and McDonnell Douglas F-15 Eagle after program depot maintenance is completed.

Along with their flight test responsibilities, the squadron also picks up and delivers aircraft, including battle-damaged aircraft, to locations where they are needed or can be repaired.

During World War II, the squadron was given, and successfully carried out, the assignment to shoot down the plane carrying Imperial Japanese Navy Admiral Isoroku Yamamoto in Operation Vengeance.

History

World War II
Combat in South and Southwest Pacific, c. 22 October 1942 – 8 August 1945. As the 339th Fighter Squadron, notably carried out Operation Vengeance on 18 April 1943, resulting in the death of Japanese admiral Isoroku Yamamoto, who had planned the attack on Pearl Harbor. Multiple pilots in the squadron earned the Navy Cross for their roles in the mission.

Air defense of Japan and Korean War
The squadron was reactivated on 20 February 1947, when it took over the personnel and aircraft from the 6th Night Fighter Squadron, which was simultaneously inactivated.  Air defense in Japan, 1946–1958. Combat in Korea, 27 June – 5 July 1950.

Tactical Air Command
The squadron was inactivated in August 1983 and its personnel and aircraft were transferred to the 69th Tactical Fighter Squadron, which was simultaneously activated.

Flight test operations
Tested possible modifications for various weapons systems, 1988–.

Lineage
 339th Tactical Fighter Squadron
 Constituted as the 339th Fighter Squadron on 29 September 1942
 Activated on 3 October 1942
 Redesignated 339th Fighter Squadron (Twin Engine) on 23 February 1943
 Redesignated 339th Fighter Squadron, Two Engine on 20 August 1943
 Inactivated on 1 January 1946
 Redesignated 339th Fighter Squadron, Single Engine on 13 July 1946
 Activated on 25 August 1946
 Redesignated 339th Fighter Squadron (All Weather) on 20 February 1947
 Redesignated 339th Fighter Squadron, All Weather on 10 August 1948
 Redesignated 339th Fighter-All Weather Squadron on 20 January 1950
 Redesignated 339th Fighter-Interceptor Squadron on 25 April 1951
 Inactivated on 15 January 1958
 Redesignated 339th Tactical Fighter Squadron on 19 December 1975
 Activated on 30 December 1975
 Inactivated on 1 July 1983 
 Consolidated with the 2875th Test Squadron as the 339th Test Squadron on 1 October 1992

 339th Flight Test Squadron
 Designated as the 2875th Test Squadron and activated on 15 January 1988
 Consolidated with the 339th Tactical Fighter Squadron as the 339th Test Squadron on 1 October 1992
 Redesignated 339th Flight Test Squadron on 15 March 1994

Assignments

 347th Fighter Group, 3 October 1942 – 1 January 1946
 Thirteenth Air Force, 25 August 1946
 347th Fighter Group (later 347th Fighter-All Weather Group), 20 February 1947 (attached to 35th Fighter Wing (later 35th Fighter-Interceptor Wing) after 1 July 1949)
 Fifth Air Force, 24 June 1950 (remained attached to 35th Fighter-Interceptor Wing until 26 June 1950, attached to 8th Fighter-Bomber Wing until 5 July 1950, again attached to 35 Fighter-Interceptor Wing)
 314th Air Division, 1 December 1950 (attached to 6162d Air Base Wing until 24 May 1951, then to 35th Fighter-Interceptor Wing)

 Japan Air Defense Force, 1 March 1952 (attached to 35th Fighter-Interceptor Wing until 20 July 1954, then to 49th Fighter-Bomber Wing)
 Fifth Air Force, 1 September 1954 (remained attached to 49th Fighter-Bomber Wing until 18 November 1954, then to 4th Fighter-Interceptor Wing)
 39th Air Division, 1 March 1955 – 15 January 1958 (attached to 4th Fighter-Interceptor Wing until 15 September 1957)
 347th Tactical Fighter Wing, 30 December 1975 – 1 July 1983
 Warner Robins Air Logistics Center, 15 January 1988
 622d Flight Test Group, 1 October 2001
 413th Flight Test Group, 1 October 2003 – present

Stations

 New Caledonia, 3 October 1942 (detachment operated from Kukum Field, Guadalcanal, Solomon Islands until 1 December 1943)
 Kukum Field, Guadalcanal, Solomon Islands, 29 December 1943
 Stirling Island, Solomon Islands, 15 January 1944
 Sansapor, New Guinea, 15 August 1944
 Middleburg Island, 19 September 1944 (operated from Morotai, Maluku Islands after 13 February)
 San Jose, Mindoro, Philippines, 22 February 1945 (continued to operate from Morotai)

 Puerto Princesa, Palawan., Philippines, 6 March – 11 December 1945 (continued to operate from Morotaiuntil until 25 March 1945)
 Camp Stoneman, California, 30 December 1945 – 1 January 1946
 Fort William McKinley, Luzon, Philippines, 25 August 1946
 Johnson Air Base, Japan, 15 December 1946
 Yokota Air Base, Japan, 1 April 1950
 Johnson Air Base, Japan, 4 August 1950
 Chitose Air Base, Japan, 20 July 1954 – 15 January 1958
 Moody Air Force Base, Georgia, 30 December 1975 – 1 July 1983
 Robins Air Force Base Georgia, 15 January 1988 – present

Aircraft operated

 Bell P-400, 1942
 Bell P-39 Airacobra, 1942–1943
 Lockheed P-38 Lightning, 1942–1945
 Northrop P-61 Black Widow (later F-61, 1947–1950
 North American F-82 Twin Mustang, 1949–1951
 Lockheed F-94 Starfire, 1951–1955
 Lockheed F-80 Shooting Star, 1953–1954
 North American F-86 Sabre, 1955–1957
 McDonnell F-4 Phantom II, 1976–1983

References

 Notes

 Citations

Bibliography

External links
 Wartime Service of Northrop P-61 Black Widow

Flight test squadrons of the United States Air Force